The 1969–70 Soviet Championship League season was the 24th season of the Soviet Championship League, the top level of ice hockey in the Soviet Union. 12 teams participated in the league, and CSKA Moscow won the championship.

Regular season

Relegation 
 Torpedo Minsk – Sibir Novosibirsk 4:8, 4:5

External links
Season on hockeystars.ru

1969–70 in Soviet ice hockey
Soviet
Soviet League seasons